Nikita Khalimonchik (born 3 January 2000) is a Belarusian professional footballer who plays for Arsenal Dzerzhinsk.

References

External links 
 
 
 Profile at Dinamo Minsk website

2000 births
Living people
Belarusian footballers
Association football defenders
FC Dinamo Minsk players
FC Smolevichi players
FC Neman Grodno players
FC Minsk players
FC Arsenal Dzerzhinsk players